The Girl from Scotland Yard is a 1937 American detective film starring Karen Morley.

Actor Jon Hall appears under the name "Lloyd Crane".

Plot
Detective Beech (Karen Morley) and reporter Holt (Robert Baldwin) pursue a death ray–wielding anarchist (Eduardo Cianelli) with a pathological hatred of England.

Cast
Karen Morley as Linda Beech
Robert Baldwin as Derrick Holt
Eduardo Ciannelli as Franz Jorg
Katharine Alexander as Lady Lavering
Lloyd Crane as Bertie
Dennis O'Keefe as John
Milli Monti as herself
Lynn Anders as Mary Smith
Richard Ted Adams as valet
Odette Myrtilas Mme Dupré
Claude King as Sir Eric Ledyard 
Leonid Kinskey as Mischa

Critical reception
Leonard Maltin wrote, "escapist story of girl trying to track down mysterious madman with destruction ray is poorly handled; not nearly as much fun as it might have been." and Fantastic Movie Musings & Ramblings wrote, "there are nice touches here and there...but all in all, it's merely rather ordinary. Not bad for a slow day and keep your expectations in check."

References

External links
 The Girl from Scotland Yard on the AFI Catalog
 

1937 films
Films directed by Robert G. Vignola
1937 mystery films
1930s English-language films
Paramount Pictures films
American mystery films
Films set in London
American black-and-white films
1930s American films